The Babruyka is a small river in Belarus, a tributary to the Berezina (Biarezina). It flows through the city of Babruysk and is named after the beavers which used to inhabit it. Due to industrial pollution, there are no more animals inhabiting the river and its flow has been reduced to a fraction of its former self.

Babruysk
Rivers of Mogilev Region
Rivers of Belarus